Marts is an English surname.

Notable people with this surname include:

 Alvin Lee Marts (born 1923), American sailor
 Lonnie Marts (born 1968), American American Football player

Mårts
Mårts is a Swedish surname.
 Pär Mårts (born 1953), Swedish ice hockey player